Bargou is a town and commune in the Siliana Governorate, Tunisia. As of 2021 it had a population of 12001.

See also
List of cities in Tunisia

References

Populated places in Tunisia
Communes of Tunisia